The Castle of Crato is a medieval castle in the civil parish of Crato e Mártires, Flor da Rosa e Vale do Peso, municipality of Crato, Portuguese district of Portalegre. 

It is classified by IGESPAR as a Site of Public Interest.

Crato
Crato
Castle Crator